Local government in Karnataka is the third tier constituting the three-tier administration set-up in the Indian state of Karnataka. It is a system of local government which forms the last level from the Centre.

History 
In ancient India, including Karnataka, despite a centralized administration under a King, there was some opportunity for local governance. This is evident from the epigraph inscriptions found across many places in Karnataka which acknowledge right to elect representatives to the assembly or Council. System similar to Panchayat Raj existed in India during Vedic period and has a History of over thousands of years. Systems similar to Grama Panchayat existed in the History with different names in different Timeline. They were called Grama Sabha, Uru, Vokkalu, Gramakaryalaya, Panchayti Kate etc.. They were headed by Urasamastaru, Oora mukhyastharu, Zameendars, Jahagirdars etc. Guidelines i.e., Constitution was compiled by the heads and were called with different names like Samaya, Sthiti, Maryade, Vyavaste, Achara vyavaste. Panchamutts (Not Matha), Agrahara, Brahmapuri, Brahmeswara Keri were the names of the areas where Brahmins resided and was headed by Mahajanaru, Oorodeya, Aiyyanavaru. Assemblies in Towns existed with names like Barabaluthi, Ayagara, Pura, Hittu, Nadu, Mahanadu, Nadagounda Pergade, Nadasabhe, Mandala, Nadu panchayati, Nyaya Samiti etc. Gaunda Prabhu, Nadashyanabogha, Nadagounda, Gouda, Heggade were the chief persons of such bodies. Nagara Mahajana, Pattana shetty, Pattanaswamy, Pattanavergade, Gowda Pattana swamy were the patriarchs of larger Urban areas namely, Nagara, Nakara, Halaru, Nagara samooha, Nakarasamooh, Mahanagara, Bananjupattana etc. Residential Tax was called Manevana and other Taxes were called Jakati. Shanuboga, Senabhovaru were the people who collected the Tax.

Overview 
Urban local bodies in Karnataka are segregated into multiple categories like City Corporations, City Municipalities, Town Municipalities and Town Panchayats based on their population. They are governed according 1964 Act for Municipalities (for City or Town Municipalities and Pattana / Town Panchayats) and 1976 Act for Municipal Corporation (for Corporations). The Government of Karnataka has set the guidelines for municipalities according to the 74th Amendment for the Constitution of India. Accordingly, at present there are 10 City Corporations, 59 City Municipal Councils, 116 Town Municipal Councils and 97 Town / Pattana Panchayats in Karnataka. Government has created Notified Area Committees (Four NACs in number) to provide municipal services for specified areas like industrial areas. The main sources of income for the municipalities are:
 Revenue collection from buildings and lands
 Water supply billing
 Licensing for the Infrastructure building and Trade
 Taxing on the advertisement
 Duty on certain transfers of property

Administrative units 
They are categorized based on life style of the inhabitants.

Urban local bodies 
According to 2011 census of India, Karnataka has about 39.6% of total population living in urbanized areas. Considering the demography, they are further classified into the following categories.

 City Corporation
 City Municipal Council
 Town Municipal Council
 Town Panchayat

Rural local bodies 
Rural local bodies include the panchayat raj institutions of this state. There are three levels in this system as follows.

 Village Panchayat
 Taluk Panchayat
 District Panchayat

Panchayat details by districts

Grama Panchayat details

Taluk Panchayat details

Zilla Panchayat details

Elections 
Elections are conducted by Karnataka State Election Commission and held once in five years. Karnataka State Election Commissioner is appointed by Governor of Karnataka. Head of the Panchayats includes:

 Urban bodies

 Corporators are the members of a City Corporation led by a Mayor.
 Councillors are the members of a City/Town Municipal Council led by a chairman.
 Councillors are the members of a Town Panchayat led by a President.

 Rural bodies

 Councillors are the members of a Village/Taluk/District Panchayat led by a President

See also 

 2021 Karnataka local elections

References 

Local government in Karnataka